Line 5 on the Brussels Metro is a rapid transit line operated by STIB/MIVB, which connects Herrmann-Debroux at the south-east of Brussels, Belgium to Erasme/Erasmus at the south-west via the city center. It exists in its current form since April 4, 2009, when the section of former line 1A between Beekkant and King Baudouin was replaced by the section of former line 1B between Beekkant and Erasme. Starting from Herrmann-Debroux, the line crosses the municipalities of Auderghem, Etterbeek, City of Brussels, Molenbeek-Saint-Jean, Koekelberg and Anderlecht. It serves 28 metro stations and has a common section with line 1 between Gare de l'Ouest/Weststation  and Mérode station, and with lines 2 and 6 between West station and Beekkant. At Arts-Loi/Kunst-Wet the line also connects with lines 2 and 6. Railway connections are possible at Brussels-Central railway station, Schuman station,  Mérode and West station. 

The first section of this line was built in the late 1960s between Schuman station and De Brouckère, but was served by trams. The first metro was brought into service on September 20, 1976, and the existing underground section was extended up to Tomberg on line 1B, and up to Beaulieu on line 1A. The line 1A was further expanded to the east, to Demey in 1977 and to Herrmann-Debroux in 1985. The line was expanded to the west, to Saint Catherine in 1977, to Beekkant in 1981, to Bockstael in 1982, to Heysel/Heizel in 1985 and to King Baudouin in 1998.

References

External links
STIB/MIVB official website
Brussels metro and tram network with dates of entry into service of individual sections

5
Anderlecht
Auderghem
City of Brussels
Etterbeek
Koekelberg
Molenbeek-Saint-Jean